William George Ashmole (1892–1968) was an English footballer who played as a winger for Burton United, Stockport County, and Watford.

Career
Ashmole played for Burton United and Stockport County. During World War I he played as a guest for West Ham United, Watford, and Port Vale. He played for Watford after the war.

Career statistics
Source:

References

1892 births
1968 deaths
Footballers from Staffordshire
English footballers
Association football wingers
Burton United F.C. players
Stockport County F.C. players
West Ham United F.C. wartime guest players
Watford F.C. wartime guest players
Port Vale F.C. wartime guest players
Watford F.C. players
English Football League players